Cnestus is a genus of ambrosia beetles.

One prominent species is Cnestus mutilatus, the camphor shot borer. It is an invasive species that originated in Asia, and has spread over much of the Eastern United States.

Description
Beetles of this genus are commonly around 3–4 mm in body length.

Etymology

The original author did not give any indication on the etymology of the genus name.

Taxonomy

Around twenty species have been described for this genus.

References

Scolytinae
Curculionidae genera